NGC 478 is a spiral galaxy in the constellation Cetus. It is located approximately 283 million light-years from Earth and was discovered in 1886 by astronomer Francis Preserved Leavenworth.

See also  
 List of NGC objects (1–1000)

References

External links 
 
 
 SEDS

Spiral galaxies
Andromeda (constellation)
0478
4803
Astronomical objects discovered in 1886